English singer-songwriter and record producer Charli XCX has embarked on 5 tours as a headlining artist (including one as a co-headlining artist), 11 tours as a supporting act, and has performed on televised programs 19 times.

She began her career performing in warehouse raves and parties in her teenage years. Between 2010 and 2013, XCX was served as a supporting act for The Ting Tings, Azealia Banks, Coldplay, Marina and the Diamonds, Sleigh Bells, Ellie Goulding, and Paramore. After finding commercial success as a featured artist on Icona Pop's "I Love It" and Iggy Azalea's "Fancy" began gaining popularity as a solo artist with tracks "Boom Clap" and "Break the Rules". XCX also released her second studio album, Sucker in 2014 and embarked on the Girl Power North America Tour to promote it.

In 2015, her and Jack Antonoff toured the US on the Charli and Jack Do America Tour. That same year, she toured alongside Katy Perry on her Prismatic World Tour. Following the release of her mixtapes Number 1 Angel and Pop 2 (both in 2017), XCX lead several brief promotional tours to promote the records. In 2017 she supported Halsey and Sia on their tours. Following a 53-stop-tour with Taylor Swift, XCX released her third studio album, Charli (2019) and kicked off the Charli Live Tour to promote it.

Headlining tours
{|class="wikitable sortable plainrowheaders" style="text-align:center;" width=100%
!scope="col" | Title
!scope="col" width=14%| Dates
!scope="col" | Associated album(s)
!scope="col" | Continent(s)
!scope="col" | Shows
!scope="col" | Gross
!scope="col" | Attendance
!scope="col" width=2% class="unsortable" | 
|-

!scope="row"| Girl Power North America Tour

|  – 25 October 2014
|Sucker
| North America
|20
|
|
|
|-
| colspan="8" style="border-bottom-width:3px; padding:5px;" |

|-
!scope="row"| Charli and Jack Do America Tour

|  – 10 October 2015
|SuckerStrange Desire
| North America
|13
|
|
|
|-
| colspan="8" style="border-bottom-width:3px; padding:5px;" |

|-
!scope="row"| Number 1 Angel Tour

|  – 22 April 2017
|Number 1 Angel
| North America, Europe
|4
|
|
|
|-
| colspan="8" style="border-bottom-width:3px; padding:5px;" |

|-
!scope="row"| Pop 2 Tour

|  – 23 October 2018
|Pop 2
| North America, Europe, Oceania
|5
|
|
|
|-
| colspan="8" style="border-bottom-width:3px; padding:5px;" |

|-
!scope="row"| Charli Live Tour

|  – 9 February 2020
|Charli
| North America, Europe, Oceania
|46
|
|
|
|-
| colspan="8" style="border-bottom-width:3px; padding:5px;" |
{{hidden
| headercss = font-size: 100%; width: 95%;
| contentcss = text-align: left; font-size: 100%; width: 95%;
| header =  Charli Tour Setlist
| content =

 "Next Level Charli"
 "Click"
 "I Don't Wanna Know"
 "Vroom Vroom"
 "Gone"
 "Warm"
 "Cross You Out"
 "February 2017"
 "Thoughts"
 "White Mercedes"
 "Official"
 "Shake It"
 "I Got It"
 "Track 10 / Blame It on Your Love"
 "Silver Cross"
 "2099"
Encore
 "Unlock It"
 "I Love It"
 "Boys"
 "1999"

}}
|-
|-
!scope="row"| How I'm Feeling Now Tour

|  – 24 October 2021
|How I'm Feeling Now
| North America, Europe
|3
|
|
|
|-
| colspan="8" style="border-bottom-width:3px; padding:5px;" |
{{hidden
| headercss = font-size: 100%; width: 95%;
| contentcss = text-align: left; font-size: 100%; width: 95%;
| header =  How I'm Feeling Now Tour Setlist
| content =

 "Visions"
 "Detonate"
 "7 Years"
 "Anthems"
 "Claws"
 "Enemy"
 "Party 4 U"
 "Pink Diamond"
 "I Finally Understand"
 "C2.0"
 "Forever"
 "Vroom Vroom"
 "Good Ones"

}}
|-
|-
!scope="row"| Crash the Live Tour

|  – 2 March 2023
|Crash
| North America, Europe, Asia, Latin America, Oceania
|69
|
|
|
|-
| colspan="8" style="border-bottom-width:3px; padding:5px;" |
{{hidden
| headercss = font-size: 100%; width: 95%;
| contentcss = text-align: left; font-size: 100%; width: 95%;
| header =  Crash Tour Setlist
| content =

 "Lightning"
 "Gone"
 "Move Me"
 "Constant Repeat"
 "Baby"
<li value="6"> "Yuck"
<li value="7"> "Every Rule"
<li value="8"> "Party 4 U"
<li value="9"> "Used To Know Me"
<li value="10"> "1999"
<li value="11"> "Beg for You"
<li value="12"> "Crash"
<li value="13"> "Boom Clap"
<li value="14"> "Boys"
<li value="15"> "New Shapes"
<li value="16"> "Twice"
Encore
<li value="17"> "Vroom Vroom"
<li value="18"> "Visions"
<li value="19"> "Unlock It"
<li value="20"> "Good Ones"

}}
|-
|}

Supporting tours

Television performances

Web performances

References

Charli XCX
XCX, Charli